Kamran Forouhar (6 March 1949 – 4 April 2000) was an Iranian actor and professional voice dubbing actor for Iranian films. He was born into a professional artist/actor family. His father was Jahangir Forouhar, and his mother Gity Forouhar (Hossein-Molla), both established movie and television actors in Iran. While in Iran he acted in a number of major movie productions and then moved to Britain in 1973. In Britain he acted in a number of major Iranian stage productions, notably The Trial of Iraj Mirza directed by Parviz Kardan. He married in 1977 and he had a son, Saam Forouhar. He is a half-brother of Leila Forouhar, a pop singer, and uncle of Reza Aslan, a scholar of religion.

References 

1949 births
2000 deaths
20th-century Iranian male actors